Aztecarpalus is a genus of ground beetles in the family Carabidae. There are about nine described species in Aztecarpalus.

Species
These nine species belong to the genus Aztecarpalus:
 Aztecarpalus hebescens (Bates, 1882)
 Aztecarpalus hemingi Ball, 1976
 Aztecarpalus lectoculus Ball, 1970
 Aztecarpalus liolus (Bates, 1882)
 Aztecarpalus marmoreus Ball, 1970
 Aztecarpalus platyderus (Bates, 1882)
 Aztecarpalus schaefferi Ball, 1970
 Aztecarpalus trochotrichis Ball, 1970
 Aztecarpalus whiteheadi Ball, 1976

References

Harpalinae